St. Anselm's North City School is a convent educational institution located in Jaipur, Rajasthan, India. The school was founded by Rev. Fr. Raymond Coelho. It is co-educational and provides liberal education through English medium. The school caters to pupils from the ages of 5 through to 18 or 19 and is open to children of all religious denominations. It is a day scholars school and affiliated to the Central Board of Secondary Education, New Delhi.

School patron

St. Anselm came from a noble Lombard family and was born in Aosta in the Italian Alps. His mother was a pious Burgundian, but after her death his father's violence and harshness finally caused Anselm to flee France. There, after several years of wandering, he took the Benedictine habit in 1060 at Bec (Normandy), where his countryman Bl. Lanfranc had started a school at the Abbey of Bec; soon he was well known for his learning. Within three years he was made Prior and after another 15 years Abbot.

As an abbot, St. Anselm had to travel to England from time to time in connection with his abbey's English properties. There he became known for his virtues and zeal: So much that in 1099 he was made Archbishop of Canterbury in the hope that he would be able to cope with the encroachments of King William the Red.

Many important writings of this general prelate, who was considered the greatest intellectual of his age, were composed during his two exiles. They earned him the title of Father of Scholasticism and Doctor of the Church (1720).

History
The history of St. Anselm's School starts from Ajmer, where in 1904, the French Capuchin Fathers founded St. Anselm's Ajmer. They adopted St. Anselm's motto for the school: Deo amabiles et hominibus, i.e., " Be Pleasing To God And To Men."

In 1987 the Diocese of Ajmer-Jaipur wanted to start a similar school in the capital city (Jaipur) to bringing the values and experience of Ajmer. For this they appointed Fr. Raymond Coelho, an educationist who had experience of having run some of the best institutions. He founded St. Anselm's Pink City School with some teachers and employees he had recruited.

In 2000, Rev. Fr. Raymond Coelho founded St. Anselm's North City School in Jaipur after his excellent work in St. Anselm's Pink City School. In the beginning the school was started in a small hut with a batch of 60 students and has now turned into a huge building for about 3000 students.  Its first batch passed out in 2010. Under the guidance of Rev. Fr. Raymond Coelho, the institution has emerged as one of the leading institute in the state.

Campus and infrastructure
The school is situated at Nivaru Road in Jaipur on the outskirts of city far from the noisy streets of the capital, providing a good environment for the students to learn.

It has one main school building. There is a large ground in front of the school building and a basketball court beside the ground. The ground is used for assemblies and ceremonies and is differentiated into a football field or a cricket field. The building has the following facilities:
A gathering place with a stage for assemblies and programmes,
Principal's office,
An office,
2 staff rooms,
60 classrooms,
Water filters and coolers for fresh water for the students,
A library,
An air-conditioned IP lab for classes XI and XII,
A computer lab for classes IV to X,
Two halls for co-curricular activities,
Physics lab
Chemistry lab
Biology lab
 Swimming Pool

The school has a chapel in the basement of the building, which is visited by the faithful for prayers and to get the blessings of the Lord. The school has a principal residence beside the school building, and a guest house nearby and a small peacock garden beside the principal's residence.

The school campus has a church named Holy Redeemer Church, situated at a distance from the ground surrounded by statues. The church has a hall in its basement that is used for celebrations, counselling or literary society meetings.

The school campus includes a basketball court. There is a swimming complex beside the principal's residence having a swimming pool. The parking area for the school vans and buses is available near the entrance gate.

Curriculum
The school follows the continuous and comprehensive evaluation (CCE), introduced by CBSE, from classes II to X.

For junior classes the subjects are mathematics, English and Hindi language and literature, social science, science, computer science, art and crafts, writing skills, moral science, general knowledge.

For middle classes VI to VIII the subjects are mathematics, English, Hindi and Sanskrit language and literature, social science (differentiated into history, civics, geography, science, computer science, art (drawing & craft), moral science, environmental studies and general knowledge.

For senior classes IX and X the subjects are mathematics, English, Hindi, literature, social science (differentiated into history, civics, geography, economics and disaster management), science (differentiated into chemistry, biology and physics), computer science]], moral science and environmental studies.

Class 10th exams cbse boards will be held in April.

The two streams for senior secondary classes XI and XII are commerce and science. The combination of subjects are:
Science - PCM (physics, chemistry & mathematics) + IP + English
Science - PCM + biology + English
Science - PCM + economics + English
Science - PCB (physics, chemistry & biology) + economics + English
Science - PCB (physics, chemistry & biology) + IP + English
Commerce - (accounting, business studies & economics) + maths + English
Commerce - (accounting, business studies & economics) + IP + English
Arts

Class 12 is prepared for Central Board of Secondary Education examinations that are held nationwide in April as per the board pattern.

Houses
The school is divided into four houses, for promoting academic and athletic competition among the pupils. The houses are Blue, Red, Green and Gold. There is a captain and vice captain of each house. A head-boy and a head-girl are elected irrespective of their house, from class XI.

Cultural programmes
A farewell party is held every year usually on the second Saturday of February which is given by class XI students to the XII class batch. There is a formal celebration party in 12th class honour and cultural events like drama, dance and songs sung by students followed by the lunch offered by the school for the parents and teachers.
Republic Day and Independence Day Celebrations are held on 26 January and 15 August, respectively. The national tricolour is hoisted by Principal followed by the national anthem of India. The cultural programme is conducted by students helped by the teachers. Republic day parades are often held.
House Day celebrations are held once in a year for each of the four houses on a new theme. These celebrations act as a platform for every student to perform on stage and show their talent in drama, dance and singing in the cultural programme. The wall magazine for each house gives a chance to the students to work in groups and express their art talents.
Annual Function and Annual Sports Meet held every year in the month of October and January Respectively.
Class assemblies are held during the morning assembly once by each class in the whole academic session.
House Day Celebrations-The students are allotted different houses at the start of the academic year and throughout the year, the members(students and teachers) are required to set up a program with a theme of their choice which includes cultural programmes as well as artistic representations based on the theme.

Literary Society meetings
The meetings are held for the students of classes VI to XI in the church basement hall in three groups. The students offer speeches, debates and perform drama skits. The meetings  are organised by the students, usually on a Saturday. At a time only two or three classes have there Literary Society Meeting like classes 6,7,8 go at one time then 9,10 and then 11,12

References

Catholic secondary schools in India
Primary schools in India
High schools and secondary schools in Rajasthan
Christian schools in Rajasthan
Schools in Jaipur
Educational institutions established in 2000
2000 establishments in Rajasthan